Daniel Parejo Muñoz (born 16 April 1989) is a Spanish professional footballer who plays as a central midfielder for Villarreal.

After starting out at Real Madrid, he first made a name in La Liga with Getafe. Transferring to Valencia in 2011, he went on to appear in 383 official matches for the latter club and win the 2019 Copa del Rey. He also spent four months in England, with Queens Park Rangers.

Across all youth levels, Parejo won 43 caps for Spain and scored nine goals. He made his full debut in 2018, at the age of 28.

Club career

Real Madrid
Born in Coslada, Community of Madrid, Parejo was a product of Real Madrid's youth academy, joining at the age of 14. He was called on several occasions by first-team coach Bernd Schuster to train with the seniors and, during the 2006–07 season, played four games for Real Madrid Castilla in Segunda División.

On 4 August 2008, Parejo signed a one-year loan deal with Championship club Queens Park Rangers, and made his debut five days later, coming off the bench in a 2–1 win against Barnsley at Loftus Road, going on to total 18 official appearances. On 17 December, Real Madrid officially recalled the player from his loan effective 1 January 2009, after first-team midfielders Rubén de la Red and Mahamadou Diarra were both out for the campaign with various physical problems.

Parejo was given the squad number 17, which had previously been assigned to Ruud van Nistelrooy, who was also out for several months due to a serious injury. He appeared little during the season, his first match being the 4–0 La Liga away victory over Sporting de Gijón on 15 February as he replaced Sergio Ramos for the final ten minutes.

Getafe
In late July 2009, as Esteban Granero was re-bought from Getafe CF, Parejo went in the opposite direction with Real, as in Granero's case, having a similar option. On 25 March 2010, he scored against his former club after stealing the ball from goalkeeper Iker Casillas, but the hosts lost it 4–2. Having to compete for a starting berth in central midfield with coach Míchel's son, Adrián – a former teammate in Real Madrid B – he nevertheless contributed solidly during the campaign as they qualified for the second time in their history for the UEFA Europa League.

Parejo appeared more in 2010–11 (36 matches), but the Madrid outskirts side only narrowly avoided relegation.

Valencia

On 14 June 2011, Valencia CF signed Parejo for a reported €6 million, with out-of-favour goalkeeper Miguel Ángel Moyá going to Getafe on a year-long loan as part of the deal. He made his league debut on 15 August, playing 80 minutes in a 1–1 away draw to RCD Mallorca.

Parejo was quickly deemed surplus to requirements at his new club, his situation not improving even after the serious injury suffered by Sergio Canales, who played in his same position. He bounced back, however, for 2012–13, scoring twice in 36 official games in an eventual fifth-place finish.

In the following years, Parejo was an undisputed starter for several managers. In the 2014–15 season, his first as captain, he scored a career-best 12 goals, being one of the best scorers in the competition from the midfielder position. In the process, he also became the first Valencia midfielder to score ten or more goals since Vicente in 2003–04. 

Parejo and Paco Alcácer each scored twice in a 5–1 win away to third-place RC Celta de Vigo on 7 November 2015; his first came just before half-time, through a free kick to put the visitors ahead 2–1. However, in January, after a poor run of form, the former was stripped of his captaincy in favour of the latter by manager Gary Neville. He was reinstated in that position by Marcelino García Toral ahead of the 2017–18 campaign.

Parejo lifted the Copa del Rey on 25 May 2019, after a 2–1 defeat of FC Barcelona in the final.

Villarreal
On 12 August 2020, Parejo joined Villarreal CF on a free transfer and a four-year contract. He moved to the local rivals alongside his teammate Francis Coquelin, a move which caused fury from Valencia's fans towards their chairman Peter Lim.

Parejo won the Europa League in his first season at the Estadio de la Cerámica. In the final, he took the free kick that Gerard Moreno finished for Villarreal's goal in a 1–1 draw against Manchester United, and also scored in the 11–10 penalty shootout victory.

International career
Parejo was named in the Spain under-19 team for the 2007 UEFA European Championship. In the tournament held in Austria, he scored the final winner against Greece (1–0).

Parejo was promoted to the under-21 team the following year, appearing in several qualification matches for the 2009 European Championship. He won his first cap for the senior team on 27 March 2018, replacing Thiago Alcântara late into the 6–1 friendly defeat of Argentina.

Career statistics

Club

International

Honours
Valencia
Copa del Rey: 2018–19

Villarreal
UEFA Europa League: 2020–21

Spain U19
UEFA European Under-19 Championship: 2007

Spain U20
Mediterranean Games: 2009

Spain U21
UEFA European Under-21 Championship: 2011

Individual
UEFA La Liga Team of The Season: 2017–18, 2018–19
UEFA Europa League Squad of the Season: 2020–21

References

External links

Villarreal official profile

CiberChe biography and stats 

1989 births
Living people
People from Coslada
Spanish footballers
Footballers from the Community of Madrid
Association football midfielders
La Liga players
Segunda División players
Segunda División B players
Real Madrid Castilla footballers
Real Madrid CF players
Getafe CF footballers
Valencia CF players
Villarreal CF players
English Football League players
Queens Park Rangers F.C. players
UEFA Europa League winning players
Spain youth international footballers
Spain under-21 international footballers
Spain international footballers
Competitors at the 2009 Mediterranean Games
Mediterranean Games medalists in football
Mediterranean Games gold medalists for Spain
Spanish expatriate footballers
Expatriate footballers in England
Spanish expatriate sportspeople in England